Aechmea rubiginosa is a plant species in the genus Aechmea. This species is native to Venezuela, Colombia, Peru, and northern Brazil.

References

rubiginosa
Flora of South America
Plants described in 1896